Ottrott is a commune in the Bas-Rhin department in Grand Est in north-eastern France. It lies southwest of Strasbourg. The vineyards in and around Ottrott produce the red Rouge d'Ottrott, a geographical denomination within the registered designation of origin Alsace AOC.

History
The village was first mentioned in 1059, in Latin in the ordnance survey of Heinrich IV. The area rose to prominence in the 13th century when a number of castles were built. Many such as Château du Birkenfels stand but are in ruins today. Château du Birkenfels was built by Burkhard Berger, a vassal of the bishop of Strasbourg.

The castle belonged to the Berger family who ruled Ottrott until 1532, then power fell to the Mundolsheim family until the French Revolution.  The castle fell into ruins after the Thirty Years' War and was taken over by the town of Obernai, becoming part of the continuous forest between Obernai and Bernardswiller.

Demographic evolution

Geography

Neighboring communes

 Bœrsch
 Saint-Nabor
 Neuviller-la-Roche
 Barr
 Le Hohwald
 Bernardswiller
 Obernai

Landmarks

 Château du Birkenfels, (13th century)
 Château de Dreistein, (13th century)
 Château du Hagelschloss, (13th century)
 Château de Kagenfels, (13th century)
 Château de Koepfel
 Château de Lutzelbourg, (13th century)
 Château de Rathsamhausen, (13th century - (15th century)
 Château de Windeck, (13th century - (14th century)
 Chapelle Saint Nicolas (17th century)
 Église Saints Simon et Jude, Built 1771.
 Mont Sainte-Odile

See also
 Communes of the Bas-Rhin department

References

External links

 Official website

Communes of Bas-Rhin
Bas-Rhin communes articles needing translation from French Wikipedia